James Gomez may refer to:
 James Gomez (politician), Singaporean politician
 James Gomez (footballer),Gambian footballer
 Jimmy Gomez, American politician